Millbridge may refer to:
 Millbridge, Plymouth - a suburb of Plymouth, England
 Millbridge, Surrey, England
 Millbridge, West Yorkshire, England
 Millbridge, Western Australia - a suburb of Bunbury, Western Australia.